Westpoint Tower is the tallest residential building in Tilburg, Netherlands. It is 141.6 metres tall, and has 48 floors. Construction of Westpoint Tower was completed in 2004. At the time of completion the tower was the highest residential building in the Netherlands until 6 November 2010 when it was surpassed by the New Orleans skyscraper in Rotterdam.

The building was designed by Margriet Eugelink (Van Aken Architektuur).

The vertical and horizontal concrete elements of the grid at the front and the back of the tower are painted in different colours. At night, lights in different colours decorate the tower.

References

Residential skyscrapers in the Netherlands
Residential buildings completed in 2004
Towers in North Brabant
Buildings and structures in Tilburg
Apartment buildings in the Netherlands